Susi-Lisa Erdmann (later Plankensteiner, born 29 January 1968) is an East German-German luger and bobsledder who competed from 1977 to 1998 in luge, then since 1999 in bobsleigh. She was born in Blankenburg, Bezirk Magdeburg. Competing in five Winter Olympics, she won two medals in the women's singles luge event with a silver in 1994 and a bronze in 1992, and a bronze at the inaugural two-women bobsleigh event in 2002. She is one of only two people to ever win a medal in both bobsleigh and luge at the Winter Olympics; Italy's Gerda Weissensteiner is the other.

Luge career
Beside the Olympics in luge, Erdmann won ten medals at the FIL World Luge Championships, including seven golds (Women's singles: 1989, 1991, 1997; Mixed team: 1990, 1991, 1993, 1995) and three silvers (Women's singles: 1995, 1996; Mixed team: 1989). She also won seven medals at the FIL European Luge Championships, including six golds (Women's singles: 1990, 1992; Mixed team: 1990, 1992, 1996, 1998) and one bronze (Women's singles: 1998). Erdmann won the overall Luge World Cup title in women's singles twice (1990–91, 1991–92).

Bobsleigh career
Erdmann switched to bobsleigh in 1998, competing both at the Winter Olympics and the FIBT World Championships. She won three medals in the two-woman event at the World Championships, with two gold (2003, 2004) and one bronze (2001). Erdmann also won the overall two-woman Bobsleigh World Cup championships for the 2001-2 and 2002-3 seasons. Her coach was Wolfgang Hoppe, who won several medals in bobsleigh during the 1980s and 1990s when he competed for both the East Germans and the Germans following 1990 reunification.

Other activities
Erdmann is a soldier in the rank of a Hauptfeldwebel and has been stationed in Munich. It was announced on 7 September 2009 FIL website that Erdmann had married Italian luger Gerhard Plankensteiner on 28 August 2009. Plankensteiner won a bronze in the men's doubles event at the 2006 Winter Olympics in Turin and gold in the same event at the 2009 world championships in Lake Placid.

Bobsleigh career highlights

Olympic Winter Games
2002 – Salt Lake City,  3rd with Nicole Herschmann
World Championships
2001 – Calgary,  3rd with Tanja Hess
2003 – Winterberg,  1st with Anne Dietrich
2004 – Königssee,  1st with Kristina Bader
European Championships
2006 – St.Moritz,  3rd with Anne Dietrich
World Cup Single Events
2001/2002 – Winterberg,  2nd with Birgit Brodbeck
2001/2002 – Winterberg,  2nd with Birgit Brodbeck
2001/2002 – Königssee,  2nd with Tanja Hess
2001/2002 – Königssee,  1st with Birgit Brodbeck
2001/2002 – Igls,  2nd with Tanja Hess
2001/2002 – Igls,  2nd with Birgit Brodbeck
2001/2002 – Calgary,  1st with Tanja Hess
2001/2002 – Calgary,  1st with Nicole Herschmann
2002/2003 – Calgary,  3rd with Tanja Hess
2002/2003 – Park City,  2nd with Anne Dietrich
2002/2003 – Park City,  2nd with Anne Dietrich
2002/2003 – Lake Placid,  2nd with Anne Dietrich
2002/2003 – Lake Placid,  2nd with Tanja Hess
2002/2003 – Igls,  1st with Anne Dietrich
2002/2003 – Igls,  1st with Anne Dietrich
2003/2004 – Calgary,  2nd with Kristina Bader
2003/2004 – Calgary,  2nd with Nicole Herschmann
2003/2004 – Lake Placid,  2nd with Nicole Herschmann
2003/2004 – Lake Placid,  1st with Kristina Bader
2003/2004 – Lillehammer,  2nd with Anne Dietrich
2004/2005 – Winterberg,  2nd with Anne Dietrich
2004/2005 – Cortina d'Ampezzo,  2nd with Anja Schneiderheinze
2004/2005 – Cesana,  3rd with Anne Dietrich
2004/2005 – St. Moritz,  3rd with Anne Dietrich
2004/2005 – Lake Placid,  2nd with Berit Wiacker
2005/2006 – Cortina d'Ampezzo,  2nd with Anne Dietrich
2005/2006 – Königssee,  1st with Anne Dietrich

References

 1998 luge women's singles results
 Bobsleigh two-woman Olympic medalists since 2002
 
 Susi-Lisa Erdmann at the Fédération Internationale de Bobsleigh et de Tobogganing
 Susi Erdmann and Gerhard Plankensteiner send their greetings as a married couple. at the Fédération Internationale de Luge de Course (7 September 2009 article accessed 11 September 2009
 
 
 
 List of European luge champions 
 
 
  
 Picture of Erdmann

External links
 
 
 
 

1968 births
Living people
People from Blankenburg (Harz)
People from Bezirk Magdeburg
German female bobsledders
German female lugers
Sportspeople from Saxony-Anhalt
National People's Army military athletes
Olympic lugers of Germany
Olympic bobsledders of Germany
Bobsledders at the 2002 Winter Olympics
Bobsledders at the 2006 Winter Olympics
Lugers at the 1992 Winter Olympics
Lugers at the 1994 Winter Olympics
Lugers at the 1998 Winter Olympics
Olympic silver medalists for Germany
Olympic bronze medalists for Germany
Olympic medalists in bobsleigh
Olympic medalists in luge
Medalists at the 2002 Winter Olympics
Medalists at the 1994 Winter Olympics
Medalists at the 1992 Winter Olympics
20th-century German women